Anna Klasen (born 15 November 1993) is a German tennis player.

She has a career-high singles ranking by the Women's Tennis Association (WTA) of 426, achieved on 6 April 2015, and a doubles ranking of 341, achieved on 19 September 2016. Klasen has won two singles titles and 14 doubles titles on the ITF Circuit. Her younger sister Charlotte Klasen is also a professional tennis player.

Klasen made her WTA Tour main-draw debut at the 2022 Hamburg European Open in the doubles draw, partnering Tamara Korpatsch.

ITF finals

Singles: 5 (2 titles, 3 runner–ups)

Doubles: 25 (15 titles, 10 runner–ups)

References

External links

1993 births
Living people
German female tennis players
21st-century German women